A dress code is a set of rules, often written, with regard to what clothing groups of people must wear. Dress codes are created out of social perceptions and norms, and vary based on purpose, circumstances, and occasions. Different societies and cultures are likely to have different dress codes, Western dress codes being a prominent example.

Dress codes are symbolic indications of different social ideas, including social class, cultural identity, attitude towards comfort, tradition, and political or religious affiliations. Dress code also allows individuals to read others' behavior as good, or bad by the way they express themselves with their choice of apparel.

History

Europe

From the seventh through the ninth centuries, the European royalty and nobility used a dress code to differentiate themselves from other people. All classes generally wore the same clothing, although distinctions among the social hierarchy began to become more noticeable through ornamented garments. Common pieces of clothing worn by peasants and the working class included plain tunics, cloaks, jackets, pants, and shoes. According to rank, embellishments adorned the collar of the tunic, waist or border. Examples of these decorations included, as James Planché states, "gold and silver chains and crosses, bracelets of gold, silver or ivory, golden and jeweled belts, strings of amber and other beads, rings, brooches, [and] buckles". The nobility tended to wear longer tunics than the lower social classes.

While dress codes of modern-day Europeans are less strict, there are some exceptions. It is possible to ban certain types of clothing in the workplace, as exemplified by the European Court of Justice's verdict that "a ban on Islamic headscarves at work can be lawful."

The Americas
The indigenous peoples of the Pacific Northwest Coast had a complex social hierarchy that consisted of slaves, commoners, and nobles, with dress codes indicating these social distinctions. John R. Jewitt, an Englishman who wrote a memoir about his years as a captive of the Nuu-chah-nulth people in 1802-1805, describes how, after some time living there, Maquinna and the chiefs decided that he must now be "considered one of them, and conform to their customs". Jewitt resented the imposition of this dress code, finding the loose untailored garments very cold, and attributed to them a subsequent illness of which he almost died. He was not allowed to cut his hair and had to paint his face and body as a Nootka would.

In North American high schools, fashion for girls began to be more revealing in the late twentieth century, including clothing such as low-rise jeans, revealing tops, miniskirts, and spaghetti straps. With these new styles appearing in schools, dress codes have in some cases become more rigorous as a result.

The dress codes in North American high schools typically resulted in tests that would determine if skirts or shorts were long enough. A common test would be used to measure the appropriate length of students' shorts/skirts. If a student's fingers extended past their clothing, then the clothing was considered a violation of the school dress code.

Muslim world 

Islam, founded in the seventh century CE, laid out rules regarding the attire of both men and women in public.  Gold adornments and silk clothes are prohibited for men to wear, as they are luxurious, but they are permissible for women.  Men are also required to wear the ihram clothing while on Hajj, or annual pilgrimage to Mecca.

It is required in Islam for women to wear a hijab at all times when in public, as part of the Islamic standard of modesty.

Indian subcontinent 
Sikhism, which was founded in the Indian subcontinent around the end of the fifteenth century, also requires a dress code. Male Sikhs, who are members of the Khalsa are required to wear a turban at all times.

Laws and social norms

Cultural values, norms, and laws regarding clothing can vary by location. For example, the degree of nudity that is acceptable changes depending on location. In New Guinea and Vanuatu, there are areas where it is customary for men to wear nothing but penis sheaths in public, while women wear string skirts. In remote areas of Bali, women may go topless, which is less common in more Western countries.

Most developed countries have generally no rules regarding specific clothing in most public scenarios.

Private dress codes

Many places have their own private dress code; these organizations may insist on particular dress codes or standards in particular situations. Such as for weddings, funerals, religious gatherings, etc.

A study was conducted on two different Christian schools, both located in the United States were surveyed on their dress code appearance. Both Christian schools were run by a board of education which was independent with a Church, and both schools implemented school uniforms two years before they even got an interview to attend the private school. After interviews were done, and the data was all collected, the school uniform was a purpose to achieve four goals that were to decrease distractions in the academic environment, show students how to dress appropriately, eliminate competition, and lower the cost of families buying school clothes for their children.

Workplace 

Employees are sometimes required to wear a uniform or certain standards of dress, such as a business suit and tie. This may depend on particular situations, for example if they are expected to interact with customers. (See also International standard business attire)

In Western countries, these policies vary depending on the industry with lawyers, bankers, and executives often wearing a suit and tie. Some businesses observe that anti-discrimination laws restricts their determining what is appropriate and inappropriate workplace clothing. Requiring men and women to dress differently at the workplace can be challenged because the gender-specific dress codes would be based on one sex and could be considered stereotypical. Most businesses have authority in determining and establishing what workplace clothes they can require of their workers. Generally, a carefully drafted dress code applied consistently does not violate anti-discrimination laws. So long as the dress code does not favor one gender over the other it is usually acceptable by law for employers to have a private dress code.

In the United States, it is legal for employers to require women to wear makeup and ban men from wearing it. It has been argued that such a distinction in a dress code is not discriminatory because both sexes have rules about their appearance. An important court case that occurred in the U.S was the Jespersen v. Harrah's Operating Co., which allowed for a workplace to require that female employees wear makeup while their male counterparts were banned from doing so. Darlene Jespersen worked at Harrah's Casino for more than 20 years and found that the makeup and dress code was not only unattainable but degrading. Jespersen found that the ‘Personal Best' policy was not true to her natural appearance as it required a full face of makeup including foundation, powder, blush, mascara, and lipstick. Jespersen stated that this policy “forced her to be ... ‘dolled up' like a sexual object, and ... took away her credibility as an individual and as a person.” In opposition men who worked at Harrah's Casino were banned from wearing makeup, nail polish, and other traditionally female attires. Judge Kozinski argued that hyperfemininity was a burden that only women employees suffered. Kozinski stated that the time, effort and expense was more of a hindrance than just being banned from wearing makeup. However despite these efforts, in the ruling, it was decided that women did not have a larger burden in the requirements of the dress code but two judges disagreed and argued that makeup takes more time and money and that sex stereotyping occurred because women's bare faces were seen as less desirable.

New Jersey BorgataBabes case

In New Jersey, twenty-one women sued the Borgata Casino Hotel & Spa for requiring them to lose weight and stay under a certain size to maintain their jobs. The women argued that the management would ridicule them over weight gain even if they were pregnant. The case was dismissed in New Jersey because the BorgataBabes program required that both men and women maintain certain body shapes and sizes. The "BorgataBabes contractually agreed to adhere to these strict personal appearance and conduct standards". In 2016, Superior Court Judge Nelson Johnson dismissed the claims because the appearance standards were lawful. He also determined that the women could return to court for their claims of a hostile environment created by the management. Workplace requirements for attire and appearance have been legal in the United States as long as there are similar requirements for both sexes. 

Doe v. Boeing Corporation 

Doe, a transgender person beginning gender transition, found that her supervisors at the engineering company, Boeing Corporation, were uncooperative with her desire to wear feminine presenting clothing to work. She was warned against wearing, "obviously feminine clothing such as dresses, skirts, or frilly blouses" and from using the women's bathroom. This was even after her counselor recommended that wearing female presenting clothing would help with her transition. After a few warnings from her supervisors, Doe showed up to work wearing a pink pantsuit and was subsequently fired for violating the dress code. This prompted Doe to legal action. The Washington State Supreme Court ultimately upheld the decision made by Boeing and stated that the company had the right to determine what female identity looked like while at work.

Equal Employment Opportunity Commission v. R.G. &. G.R Harris Funeral Homes, Inc. 

Aimee Stephens, a transgender woman, worked at the R.G. &. G.R Harris Funeral Homes and originally was dressing as a stereotypical male following the funeral home's male attire, but Stephens had intended to transition to female attire to better suit her gender identity. Thomas Rost, the owner of the funeral home, fired Stephens for not presenting herself as a man and for dressing like a woman. Stephens opened a case at the Equal Employment Opportunity Commission, stating discrimination based on sex and gender but the district court sided with the funeral home stating, "that transgender status is not a protected trait under Title VII". In the Sixth Circut Court of Appeals, it was ruled that Stephens was unlawfully fired based on sex discrimination, which does protect transgender people. The United States Supreme Court ruled in 2020 against firing someone for being homosexual or transgender, as being discrimination based on sex.

Formal wear 

In Western countries, a "formal" dress code typically means coats for men and evening dresses for women. The most-formal dress code is a full-length ball or evening gowns with evening gloves for women and for men white tie, which also includes a tailcoat. "Semi-formal" has a much less precise definition but typically means an evening jacket and tie for men (known as black tie) and a dress for women. "Business casual" typically means not wearing neckties or suits, but wearing instead collared shirts, and trousers (not black, but more relaxed, including things such as corduroy). "Casual" typically just means clothing for the torso, legs and shoes. "Wedding Casual" defines yet another mode of dress, where guests dress respectfully, but not necessarily fancily.

Business casual 

Business casual dress is a popular workplace dress code that emerged in white-collar workplaces in Western countries in the 1990s, especially in the United States and Canada. Many information technology businesses in Silicon Valley were early adopters of this dress code. In contrast to formal business wear such as suits and neckties (the international standard business attire), the business casual dress code has no generally accepted definition; its interpretation differs widely among organizations and is often a cause of sartorial confusion among workers.

The job search engine Monster.com offers this definition, "In general, business casual means dressing professionally, looking relaxed, yet neat and pulled together." A more pragmatic definition is that business casual dress is the mid ground between formal business clothes and street clothes. Generally, neckties are excluded from business casual dress, unless worn in nontraditional ways. The acceptability of blue jeans and denim cloth clothing varies — some businesses consider them to be sloppy and informal.

Education system 

Many schools around the world implement dress codes in the school system to prevent students from wearing inappropriate clothing items to school and was thought to help influence a safer and more professional environment.

United States education 
In 1996, former U.S. President Bill Clinton announced his support for the idea of school uniforms by stating, "School uniforms are one step that may help break the cycle of violence, truancy and disorder by helping young students understand what really counts is what kind of people they are." Many school districts in the United States took up the idea. In all 70 schools, comprising around 60,000 students, switched to school uniforms. School uniforms have been used with several schools to teach students how to dress appropriately, and in cases it has worked, and has decreased distractions in the educational systems. 

One common criticism of school dress codes in the U.S. is that they infringe on students' right to self-expression. There have been many court cases regarding school dress code, the first being Tinker v. Des Moines Independent Community School District, which involved students wearing black armbands to protest the Vietnam war.

Within the educational system, the Federation supports professional dress code standards for all teachers.

Dress code violations
"Communicative" dress code violations are violations where the clothing has implications of hate, violence, gang-affiliation, etc. In cases where dress code rules in public school systems have been violated by non-communicative clothing, courts repeatedly legitimise dress code discrimination based on gender. Amongst the transgender populations, gender based dress codes are primarily enforced against individuals who do not yet pass.

Violation of dress codes have become a subject of school protests, such as at a high school in Toronto, which had a protest after a student was disciplined for wearing a crop top. Students at multiple schools have protested gender discrimination in the application of dress codes.

Dress code backlash 
Certain dress code restrictions in schools across North America have been accused of perpetuating sexist standards. In March 2014, a group of middle-school girls from Evanston, Illinois, protested their school's dress code, which prohibited them from wearing leggings to school under the pretense that it was "too distracting for boys." Thirteen-year-old student Sophie Hasty was quoted in the Evanston Review saying that "not being able to wear leggings because it's 'too distracting for boys' is giving us the impression we should be guilty for what guys do." In a Time magazine article covering the incident, Eliana Dockterman argued that teachers and administration in these schools are "walking the fine line between enforcing a dress code and slut shaming."

School dress codes seem to also be gender-biased towards young girls. The research article, "Objectification Study on High School Girls" conducted interviews with middle school girls, one of them describing, "If they're [boys] wearing a sleeveless basketball jersey, it doesn't fully cover their shoulders. They don't usually get called out for that. Guys are not the ones that they're looking out for. So they dress code girls, so guys don't get distracted. But they don't think that girls are going to get distracted by guys' shoulders." 

On Monday, September 22, 2014, "about 100 pupils walked out of Bingham high school in South Jordan, Utah" after more than a dozen girls were turned away from a homecoming dance for wearing dresses which violated the dress code. "School staff allegedly lined up girls against a wall as they arrived and banished about two dozen for having dresses which purportedly showed too much skin and violated the rules." It is believed that this act was awkward and humiliating towards the female students, which spawned the walkouts.

In August 2021, one student's mother criticized her daughter's school for continuing to enforce clothing restrictions on girls while allowing students to opt out of mask-wearing during the COVID-19 pandemic.

There have been several issues with dress code backlash happening to several students, such as a 15-year-old girl who attended Edmonton High school, she was banned from attending her school due to dying her hair blue, this resulted in the girl suing her principal for discrimination. In another case, a 16-year-old girl was sent home because she refused to take her eyebrow ring out.

Canadian education

Dress code backlash 
A Canadian teenager, Lauren Wiggins, was given detention in May 2015 for wearing a floor-length dress with a halter neckline. The punishment prompted Wiggins to write an open letter to the school's assistant vice principal at Harrison Trimble High School in Moncton, New Brunswick. In the letter, Wiggins concentrated specifically on the fact that females are often blamed for the behaviour of males, saying that if a boy "will get distracted by my upper back and shoulders then he needs to be sent home and practice self-control." She was then given a one-day suspension after writing and submitting the letter.

In Ontario, Canada, there were a few backlash incidents that occurred which consisted of girls being sent home due to wearing shorts that were too short. The other case happened in British Columbia where students were directed to wear clothes that were in good taste, and clothing that displayed a business look. Another case that took place in British Columbia was a young women got sent home from her high school, because her principal stated that her shirt was inappropriate due to the of show of too much cleavage. These are a few of the many cases that have resulted in a backlash against dress codes.

See also

Clothing laws by country
Costume
Full dress
Dress clothes
Hemline
High heel policy
Nonverbal communication
Smart casual
Social role of hair
Subculture
Sumptuary law
Uniform
Uniform fetishism
Western dress code
Workwear

References

Pratt, Michael G., and Anat Rafaeli. "Organizational Dress as a Symbol of Multilayered Social Identities." Academy of Management Journal, vol. 40, no. 4, 1997, pp. 862-898. .

External links 

 (Beach Buzz)